Salt Creek Township is one of eleven townships in Monroe County, Indiana, United States. As of the 2010 census, its population was 1,513 and it contained 822 housing units.

History
Salt Creek Township was established in 1825. It was named from a salt spring which was the center of an early salt manufacturing industry.

Geography

Unincorporated towns
 Knight Ridge at 
 Woodville Hills at 
(This list is based on USGS data and may include former settlements.)

Former communities
 Paynetown at  - flooded by Lake Monroe

Cemeteries
The township contains Friendship Cemetery.

Major highways
  Indiana State Road 46

School districts
 Monroe County Community School Corporation

Political districts
 Indiana's 9th congressional district
 State House District 60
 State Senate District 44

References
 
 United States Census Bureau 2008 TIGER/Line Shapefiles
 IndianaMap

External links
 Indiana Township Association
 United Township Association of Indiana
 City-Data.com page for Salt Creek Township

Townships in Monroe County, Indiana
Bloomington metropolitan area, Indiana
Townships in Indiana